Rhagodera is a genus of cylindrical bark beetles in the family Zopheridae. There are at least four described species in Rhagodera.

Species
These four species belong to the genus Rhagodera:
 Rhagodera costata Horn, 1867
 Rhagodera interrupta Stephan, 1989
 Rhagodera texana Stephan, 1989
 Rhagodera tuberculata Mannerheim, 1843

References

Further reading

 
 

Zopheridae
Articles created by Qbugbot